Arhinia is the congenital partial or complete absence of the nose at birth. It is an extremely rare condition, with few reported cases in the history of modern medicine.  It is generally classified as a craniofacial abnormality.

Cause
The cause of arrhinia is not known.  Akkuzu's study of the literature found that all cases had presented a normal antenatal history.

Diagnosis

Treatment
Treatment focuses on identifying the nature of the anomalies through various imaging methods, including MRI and CAT scan, and surgical correction to the extent possible.

References

External links 

 Arrhinia

Congenital disorders of respiratory system
Rare diseases